This is the year-to-year membership and makeup of the Continental Basketball League, including league divisional alignment and the circumstances of teams no longer in the league.

Alignments

2010

2011

* Folded mid-season

Defunct teams/failed expansion
Carolina Cougarz
Port City Sharks

Teams that left the CBL for another league
  Birmingham Steel - joined World Basketball Association, folded
 Cary Invasion - joined Tobacco Road Basketball League
 Fayetteville Crossover - joined Tobacco Road Basketball League
 Florida Flight - joined Florida Basketball Association
 Georgia Gwizzlies - rejoined the American Basketball Association after being removed from the league
 Miami Stars - joined Florida Basketball Association
 Palm Beach Titans - joined Florida Basketball Association
 Wilmington Sea Dawgs - joined Tobacco Road Basketball League

Timeline

References

Continental Basketball League